William Joseph Gormlie (1911 – 1976) was an English football player and manager. He played as a goalkeeper for Blackburn Rovers and Northampton Town. He used to coach R.S.C. Anderlecht and the Belgium national team.

References

1911 births
1976 deaths
English footballers
Association football goalkeepers
Blackburn Rovers F.C. players
Northampton Town F.C. players
English football managers
R.S.C. Anderlecht managers
Belgium national football team managers
English Football League players